West Rural Hill is an unincorporated community in Hamilton County, Illinois, United States.

References

Unincorporated communities in Hamilton County, Illinois
Unincorporated communities in Illinois